The National Monuments of Sierra Leone, in West Africa, are proclaimed in accordance with the Monuments and Relics Ordinance of 1947 with Dr Macormack Charles Farrell Easmon serving as the first chairman of the Monuments and Relics Commission. Eighteen National Monuments have been proclaimed, although two have since been demolished. Sierra Leone accepted the UNESCO World Heritage Convention in 2005, but is yet to nominate a site for inscription. A three-year research project funded by the UK Arts and Humanities Research Council in the late 2000s investigated the "object diaspora" of movable Sierra Leonean cultural properties in the context of European museums and has led to the creation of a digital resource relating to the country's cultural heritage. The sites are maintained by the Sierra Leonean Monuments and Relics Commission, a branch of the country's Ministry of Tourism and Culture.

The two National Monuments that are no longer traceable were both in Freetown. They were a fireplace removed from a now demolished building and some military butts (shooting ranges).

See also
 History of Sierra Leone
 List of heritage registers
 Art repatriation
 UNESCO General History of Africa

References

External links
 National Monuments of Sierra Leone
 Cultural Policy in Sierra Leone (UNESCO)

Heritage registers in Sierra Leone
Sierra
National Monuments
National Monuments